Tapa Gaccha is the largest Gaccha (monastic order) of Svetambara Jainism.

History 
Tapa Gaccha was founded by Acharya Jagatchandra Suri in Vikram Samvat 1285 (1228 AD). He was given the title of "Tapa" (i.e., the meditative one) by the ruler of Mewar. This title was applied to the group.

Under Vijayanandsuri's leadership and other monks, Shwetambara Murtipujak Conference was established in 1893 which reformed mendicant as well as lay religious practices. As a result of this reform, most Shwetambara Jain monks today belong to Tapa Gaccha.

Today, the majority of its followers live in states such as Gujarat, Maharashtra, Tamil Nadu, West Bengal, Punjab and Rajasthan.

Denominations
Later Tapa Gachha is followed by 21 different samuday or orders. The sects follow different rituals but they do not have differences about scriptures.

Some of these differences include Tithi (calendar date), veneration of gurus, pilgrimage of Palitana temples during monsoon and Santikaram (a religious text) chanting on Chaturdasi (14th day in each half of month in Jain calendar).

Till the time of Nemisuri, there was a unity in Tapa Gachcha because of lack of proper knowledge about Tithi decision. Ramchandrasuri of Prem Suri follows his guru and corrected tithi decision which was followed by other three groups(Samudaay) of Jain Monks. 'Be Tithi Paksh''' with the view that religious ritual Tithi can be omitted or held more than one time in the religious calendar. In 1935, on Samvatsari, the last day of Paryushan, Ramchandrasuri order observed it on a different day. This became a sectarian issue and tapa gachcha separated into new Be Tithi Paksh or 'two date fraction' and existing Ek Tithi Paksh or 'one date fraction'. Anandji Kalyanji Trust, which manages 1200 Jain temples, unsuccessfully attempted several times to resolve the issue. In 1986, Bhuvanbhanu suri order formally separated from Premsuri order and Ramchandra suri followed for two more years then stuck to Right decision of Tithi.

Other distinguishing factors include veneration of gurus using Vasakshep (a sandalwood powder used for worship) between these two fractions. Be tithi fraction believe that Guru or Acharya should be venerated by Navangi Guru Poojan, spreading powder on nine points of body while Ek tithi fraction believe that it should be spread on one point of body, Akangi Guru Poojan''. Both fractions differ on pilgrimage of Palitana temples on mount Shatrunjay by lay persons during monsoon.

See also
 Tristutik Gaccha
 Kharatara Gaccha
 Jain schools and branches

References

Citations

Sources
 

Śvētāmbara sects
1229 establishments in Asia
13th-century establishments in India